Agnieszka Rawinis (born March 24, 1995) is a Polish female acrobatic gymnast. With partners Marta Srutwa and Karolina Nowak, Rawinis competed in the 2014 Acrobatic Gymnastics World Championships.

References

1995 births
Living people
Polish acrobatic gymnasts
Female acrobatic gymnasts
Place of birth missing (living people)